Paul William Hait (born May 25, 1940) is an American former competition swimmer and breaststroke specialist who is an Olympic champion and former world record-holder.

Hait won a gold medal in the 4×100 m medley relay at the 1960 Summer Olympics in Rome, where he swam in the preliminary heats (with Steve Clark, Bob Bennett and Dave Gillanders) and in the final (with Frank McKinney, Lance Larson and Jeff Farrell), breaking the world record in both the heats and the finals.  Individually, he finished eighth in the men's 200-meter breaststroke with a time of 2:41.4.

See also
 List of Olympic medalists in swimming (men)
 List of Stanford University people
 World record progression 4 × 100 metres medley relay

References

1940 births
Living people
American male breaststroke swimmers
World record setters in swimming
Olympic gold medalists for the United States in swimming
Sportspeople from Pasadena, California
Stanford Cardinal men's swimmers
Swimmers at the 1960 Summer Olympics
Medalists at the 1960 Summer Olympics